Linnaeus's flower clock was a garden plan hypothesized by Carl Linnaeus that would take advantage of several plants that open or close their flowers at particular times of the day to accurately indicate the time. 
According to Linnaeus's autobiographical notes, he discovered and developed the floral clock in 1748. It builds on the fact that there are species of plants that open or close their flowers at set times of day. His observations of how plants changed over time are summarised in several publications. Calendarium florae (the Flower Almanack) describes the seasonal changes in nature and the botanic garden during the year 1755. In Somnus plantarum (the Sleep of Plants), he describes how different plants prepare for sleep during the night, and in Vernatio arborum he gives an account of the timing of leaf-bud burst in different trees and bushes. He may never have planted such a garden, but the idea was attempted by several botanical gardens in the early 19th century, with mixed success. Many plants exhibit a strong circadian rhythm (see also Chronobiology), and a few have been observed to open at quite a regular time, but the accuracy of such a clock is diminished because flowering time is affected by weather and seasonal effects. The flowering times recorded by Linnaeus are also subject to differences in daylight due to latitude: his measurements are based on flowering times in Uppsala, where he taught and had received his university education.

The plants suggested for use by Linnaeus are given in the table below, ordered by recorded opening time; "-" signifies that data are missing.

Cultural references to the concept 
Some 30 years before Linnaeus's birth, such a floral clock may have been described by Andrew Marvell, in his poem "The Garden" (1678):
How well the skilful gardener drew
Of flow'rs and herbs this dial new;
Where from above the milder sun
Does through a fragrant zodiac run;
And, as it works, th' industrious bee
Computes its time as well as we.
How could such sweet and wholesome hoursBe reckoned but with herbs and flow'rs!In Terry Pratchett's novel Thief of Time, a floral clock with the same premise is described. It features fictional flowers that open at night "for the moths", so runs all day.

See also
 Floral clock

References

External links 
 Online text of Philosophia Botanica

Botany